The 2011 Volta ao Algarve was the 37th edition of the Volta ao Algarve cycling stage race. It was held from 16 to 20 February 2011, and was rated as a 2.1 event on the UCI Europe Tour. Just like the previous year, it started at the Algarve Stadium in Faro and ended with an individual time trial in Portimão.

Teams and cyclists
There were 21 teams in the 2011 Volta ao Algarve. Among them were 12 UCI ProTour teams, five UCI Professional Continental teams, and four Continental teams. Each team was allowed eight riders on their squad, giving the event a peloton of 168 cyclists at its outset.

The 21 teams in the race were:

UCI ProTour Teams

UCI Professional Continental Teams
Caja Rural
CCC–Polsat–Polkowice

UCI Continental Teams
Barbot–Efapel
LA–Antarte
Onda
Tavira–Prio

Tour stages

Stage 1
16 February 2011 – Algarve Stadium to Albufeira,

Stage 2
17 February 2011 – Lagoa to Lagos,

Stage 3
18 February 2011 – Tavira to Malhão,

Stage 4
19 February 2011 – Albufeira to Tavira,

Stage 5
20 February 2011 – Lagoa to Portimão,

Classification leadership
In the 2011 Volta ao Algarve, four different jerseys were awarded. For the general classification, calculated by adding each cyclist's finishing times on each stage, and allowing time bonuses for the first three finishers on each stage and in intermediate sprints, the leader received a yellow jersey. This classification was considered the most important of the Volta ao Algarve, and the winner is considered the winner of the Volta.
Additionally, there was a sprints classification, which awarded a blue jersey. In the sprints classification, cyclists got points for finishing in the top three in an intermediate sprint. The first across the sprint points got 3 points, the second got 2, and the third got a single point.

There was also a mountains classification, which awarded a green jersey. In the mountains classification, points were won by reaching the top of a mountain before other cyclists. Each climb was categorized, with the more difficult climbs awarding more points.

The points classification awarded a white jersey. In the points classification, cyclists got points based on the order at the finish line of each stage. The stage win afforded 25 points, second on the stage was worth 20, third 16, fourth 13, fifth 10, sixth 8, seventh 6, eighth 4, ninth 2, and tenth was worth a single point. The points awarded in the sprints classification counted equivalently for this classification.

There was fifth classification to this race for the best Portuguese rider. However, no jersey was awarded, since the UCI limits the amount of rewarded jerseys to four per race.

The race also awarded a teams classification, which, too, was not represented by a jersey. The teams classification was calculated by adding the times of each team's best three riders per stage per day.

References

2011
2011 in Portuguese sport
2011 UCI Europe Tour